The Skånes Fotbollförbund (Scania Football Association) is one of the 24 district organisations of the Swedish Football Association. It administers lower tier football in the non-administrative province of Scania.

Background 

Skånes Fotbollförbund, commonly referred to as Skånes FF, is the governing body for football in the historical province of Skåne, the corresponding area being Skåne County. The Association was founded on 23 March 1919 and currently has 376 member clubs.  Skånes FF is based in Malmö.

Affiliated Members 

The following clubs are affiliated to the Skånes FF (2017):

AC Kvarnby
Afro FK
AIF Barrikaden
Allerums GIF
Anderslövs BoIK
Ariana FC
Arlövs BI
Askeröds IF
Asmundtorps IF
Athletic Club
Backarnas FF
Ballingslöv GoIF
Bara GoIF
Baskemölla IF
Båstads GoIF
Billeberga GIF
Billesholms GIF
Billesholms IK
Bjärelaget DFF
Bjärlövs IF
Bjärnums GoIF
Bjärreds IF
Bjuvstorps FF
BK Flagg
BK Fram
BK Höllviken
BK Kick
BK Landora
BK Näset
BK Olympic
BK Skansen
BK Vången
Blentarps BK
Borgeby FK
Borrby IF
Borstahusens BK
Bosna FF
Bosnien Hercegovinas SK
Bosniska FK Behar
Branteviks IF
Broby IF
Brösarps IF
Brunnby FF
Bunkeflo FF
BW 90 IF
Croatia Helsingborg KIF
Dalby GIF
Degeberga GoIF
DFK Borgeby 09
Djurröds IK
Dösjöbro IF
Edenryds IF
Ekeby GIF
Ekets GoIF
Engelholms BK
Eskilsminne DFF
Eskilsminne IF
Eslövs BK
Esperöds SK
Everöds IF
Färingtofta IK
Farstorps GoIF
FBK Balkan
FC Bellevue
FC Canarias
FC Drottninghög
FC Dösjöbro
FC Helsingkrona
FC Hessleholm
FC Kopparmöllan
FC Krubban
FC Malmö United
FC Möjligheten
FC Möllan
FC New Life
FC Näset
FC Örkelljunga
FC Österlen
FC Plisat
FC Rosengård
FC Rosengård 1917
FC Staffanstorp
FC Trelleborg
FC Törnrosen
FC Västra Hamnen
FF Vuk
Finja IF
Fjälkinge IF
FK Besa
FK Bosna
Förslövs IF
Fortuna FF
Furulunds IK
Futsal Club Ängelholm
Gantofta IF
Gärds Köpinge IF
Gärsnäs AIS
Genarps IF
GIF Nike
Gislövs IF
Glemmingebro IF
Glimåkra IF
Glumslövs FF
GOF IF
Grevie GIK
Gröstorps IF
Gualövs GOIF
Gunnarstorps IF
Gylle AIF
Gyllebo IF
Håkanstorps BK
Häljarps IF
Hallands Nations FF
Hammenhögs IF
Hanaskogs IS
Hardeberga BK
Harlösa IF
Harrie FF
Härslövs IK
Hasslarps BK
Hässleholm Freeflow FC
Hässleholms IF
Hästveda IF
Heleneholms SK
Helsingborg City FC
Helsingborg SC
Helsingborg Östra IF
Helsingborgs AIS
Helsingborgs FF
Helsingborgs IF
Helsingborgs IF Akademi
HF Olympia
Hittarps IK
Hjärnarps GIF
Hjärsås/Värestorps IF
Högaborgs BK
Höganäs BK
Höllvikens DFF
Holma-Kroksbäck IF
Holmeja IS
Höörs IS
Höörs United FF
Hörby FF
Hörja IF
Hovs GoIF
Huaröds IF
Hurva IF
Husie IF
Hyllie IK
Hyllinge GIF
IF Ale
IF Alexander den Store
IF Limhamn Bunkeflo
IF Lödde
IF Salamis
IFK Hässleholm
IFK Höganäs
IFK Klagshamn
IFK Knislinge
IFK Malmö FK
IFK Osby
IFK Rössjöholm
IFK Simrishamn
IFK Trelleborg
IFK Ystad FK
Ifö Bromölla IF
IK Bergandy
IK Kamp
IK Pandora FF
IK Wormo
Ingelstorps IF
Iranska FF
Ivö BK
Jägersborgs IF
Janstorps AIF
Järrestad FF
Jonstorps IF FK
Kågeröds BoIF
Kävlinge GoIF
Kiaby IF
Kiviks AIF
Klågerups GoIF
Klagstorps IF
Klippans Förenade FF
Köpingebro IF
Korpen Malmö IF
Kristianstad FC
Kristianstads DFF
Kristianstads FF
Kronan FC
Kropps GoIF
KSF Kosova
KSF Makedonija
KSF Prespa Birlik
KSF Srbija Malmö
Kullabygdens DFF
Kulladals FF
Kullavägens BK
Kungshults IK
Kurdiska IF Malmö
Kvarnby IK
Kvidinge IF
Landskrona BoIS
Liga 06 IF
Lilla Beddinge BK
Lilla Torg FF
Limhamns FF
Limhamns FF 1948
Linderöds IF
Linero IF
Liria IF
Listorps IF
Ljungbyheds IF
Löberöds IF
Löderups IF
Lönsboda GoIF
Lomma FF
Lövestads IF
Lunds BK
Lunds BOIS
Lunds FF
Lunds SK
Lunnarps BK
Maglasäte IF
Makedoniska IF
Mala IF
Malmö Boys IF
Malmö City FC
Malmö FF
Malmö Futsal Club
Malmö FVC
Malmö IKF
Marieholms IS
MF Pelister
Minnesbergs IF
MKSF Pelagonija
Mörarps IF
Munka Ljungby IF
Näsby IF
Näsets FF
Näsums IF
Nävlinge IF
NK Croatia
Norra Rörums GIF
Nosaby IF
Onslunda IF
Orient FC
Ovesholms IF
Oxie SK
Perstorp Bälinge IK
Råå DIF
Råå IF
Ramlösa Södra IF
Röke IF
Romele FC
Rörsjöstadens IF
Rörums SK
Rosengårds FF
Röstånga IS
Rydsgårds AIF
Rynge IK
Sambafotbollsskolan FF
Sankt Olofs IF
Seveds FK
Sibbhults IF
Sjöbo FF
Sjöbo IF
SK Hakoah
Skabersjö DFF
Skabersjö IF
Skäldervikens IF
Skånekurd FF
Skånes Fagerhults IF
Skanör Falsterbo IF
Skegrie BK
Skepparslövs IF
Skillinge IF
Skivarps GoIF
Skurups AIF
Skurups DFF
Smedstorps IF
Snogeröds IF
Södra Rörums Bygdeförening
Södra Sandby IF
SoGK Charlo
Spanska Akademin FF
Sösdala IF
Sövde IF
Sövestads IF
Spjutstorps IF
Staffanstorp United FC
Staffanstorp United FC Ungdom
Stattena IF
Stehags AIF
Stockamöllans IF
Stora Harrie IF
Strömsborgs IF
Strövelstorps GoIF
Svalöv United FC
Svalövs BK
Svedala IF
Svedbergs GoIF
Svensköps IF
Svenstorps IF
Tågarps AIK
Team Sandby IF
Teckomatorps SK
Teknologkårens IF LTH
TFK Nova Eslöv
Tjörnarps BoIF
Tollarps IF
Tomelilla IF
Torekovs IK
Torna Hällestads IF
Torns IF
Tosteberga/Nymölla IF
Treby IF
Trelleborg United FF
Trelleborgs FF
Trollenäs IF
Turkisk Center FF
Tygelsjö BK
Tygelsjö Västra Klagstorps IF
Tyringe IF
Ungdoms Respekt FF
Uppåkra IF
Vallåkra IF
Vankiva IF
Vanneberga FF
Vanneberga IF
Vanstads IF
Väsby FK
Västra Ingelstad IS
Västra Karups IF
Veberöds AIF
Vedby/Rönne IF
Vegeholms IF
Vejby IF
Vellinge FF
Vellinge IF
Venestad IF
Verums GoIF
Viby IF
Vikens IK
Vinnö IF
Vinslövs IF
Vittsjö DFK
Vittsjö GIK
Vittskövle IF
VMA IK
Wästra Allmänna FF
Wisseltofta IF
Wollsjö AIF
Yngsjö IF
Ystads IF FF
Åhus Horna BK
Åhus IF
Åhus Sports Club
Åkarps IF
Åstorps FF
Åsums BK
Ängelholms FF
Ödåkra IF
Öja FF
Önneköps IF
Önnestad BoIF
Örtofta IS
Össjö IS
Östanå Bruks IF
Österlen FF
Österslövs IS
Östra Ljungby IF
Östra Sönnarslövs IF
Östra-Torp Smygehuk FF

League Competitions 
Skånes FF run the following League Competitions:

Men's Football
Division 4  -  three sections
Division 5  -  six sections
Division 6  -  eight sections
Division 7  -  six sections

Women's Football
Division 3  -  two sections
Division 4  -  four sections
Division 5  -  six sections

Footnotes

External links 
 Skånes FF Official Website 
 SvFF page 

Skånes
Sports organizations in Malmö
Football in Skåne County
Sports organizations established in 1919
1919 establishments in Sweden